Mathew Bevan (born 10 June 1974) is a British hacker from Cardiff, Wales. In 1996 he was arrested for hacking into secure U.S. Government networks under the handle Kuji. At the age of 21, he hacked into the files of the Griffiss Air Force Base Research Laboratory in New York.

Intent on proving a UFO Conspiracy Theory; his sole tool was a Amiga with a blue box program called Roxbox. He was one of two hackers said to have nearly started a third world war. according to Supervisory Special Agent Jim Christy, at the time working for the Air Force Office of Special Investigations

Background
Bullied by his peers,  Bevan had a difficult time with school and turned to the online world at night for an escape. Having been told ways to negate the phone system, he could call anywhere in the world without charges appearing on his bill. Bevan began to lead a double-life, a normal school life during the day followed by his now well-publicized nocturnal activities.

On 21 June 1996 he was arrested in connection with hacking incidents relating to several sensitive USAF, NASA, and NATO establishments. The United States Senate had already misinterpreted the situation and branded Bevan's pseudonym Kuji as a "Foreign Agent, possibly of Eastern European origin".

A U.S. Air Force investigator summed up the risks and concerns brought about by their hacking, how Bevan's alleged partner Richard Pryce (Datastream Cowboy), then 16 years old, hacked his way into a research facility in Korea, and dumped the contents of the Korean Atomic Research Institute's database on the USAF system. The concern was that if North Korea noticed, they would think the transfer of data was an intrusion by the U.S. Air Force, and threaten physical retaliation for the espionage; fortunately it turned out to be South Korean data, significantly less volatile.

At Woolwich Crown Court, Friday 21 November 1997 some 18 months later, the CPS decided that it was no longer in the public interest to pursue the case. They offered 'no evidence' which resulted in a full acquittal being recorded. He used to live in Devizes, Wiltshire.

Bevan has commented on the Gary McKinnon case as being very similar to his own.

References

External links
 Kuji Media Corporation (archive of news stories relating to case)
 NOAA list of several hackers of U.S. Government systems
 Article about Mathew Bevan by Dr. George Smith, Ph.D. in his Crypt Newsletter
 Lengthy interview citing history of the case along with tv spots

British computer criminals
1974 births
Living people
People from Cardiff
Hacking (computer security)